Komorowo  is a village in the administrative district of Gmina Trzebnica, within Trzebnica County, Lower Silesian Voivodeship, in south-western Poland.

Komorowo was once divided into two villages: Wielkie Komorowo and Małe Komorowo.

References

Komorowo